Tilly of Bloomsbury is a 1921 British silent comedy film directed by Rex Wilson and starring Edna Best, Tom Reynolds, Henry Kendall and Isabel Jeans. It is based on the play Tilly of Bloomsbury by Ian Hay, and was the first of three film adaptations.

Cast
 Edna Best as Tilly Welwyn
 Tom Reynolds as Samuel Stillbottle
 Campbell Gullan as Percy Welwyn
 Henry Kendall as Dick Mainwaring
 Helen Haye as Lady Adela Mainwaring
 Frederick Lewis as Abel Mainwaring
 Georgette de Nove as Martha Welwyn
 Leonard Pagden as Lucius Welwyn
 Isabel Jeans as Sylvia Mainwaring
 Vera Lennox as Amelia Mainwaring
 Lottie Blackford as Mrs. Banks

References

External links

1921 films
1921 comedy films
British comedy films
British films based on plays
Films based on works by Ian Hay
British silent feature films
Films directed by Rex Wilson
Films produced by G. B. Samuelson
Films set in England
Films set in London
British black-and-white films
1920s English-language films
1920s British films
Silent comedy films